Euphaedra aurivillii is a butterfly in the family Nymphalidae. It is found in the central and eastern part of the Democratic Republic of the Congo.

References

Butterflies described in 1914
aurivillii
Endemic fauna of the Democratic Republic of the Congo
Butterflies of Africa